Jollie is the surname of:

 Edward Jollie (1825–1894), a pioneer land surveyor in New Zealand
 Ethel Tawse Jollie (1874–1950), writer and political activist in Southern Rhodesia, first female parliamentarian in the British overseas empire
 Francis Jollie (1815–1870), New Zealand settler and politician
 Thomas Jollie, (1629–1703), English Dissenter, a minister ejected from the Church of England for his beliefs
 Timothy Jollie (c. 1659–1714), English nonconformist minister and educator

See also
 Jolley (surname), a list of people surnamed either Jolley or Jolly